Orychodes is a genus of beetle in the Brentidae family.

Species 
According to the Brentidae of the World checklist, the following species are accepted within Orychodes:

 Orychodes abnormis (Kleine, 1921)
 Orychodes andrewsi Gahan, 1900
 Orychodes digramma (Boisduval, 1835)
 Orychodes fasciatus (Kleine, 1921)
 Orychodes indus Kirsch, 1875
 Orychodes insulanus (Kleine, 1921)
 Orychodes maassi (Kleine, 1926)
 Orychodes nigerrimus (Kleine, 1921)
 Orychodes octoguttatus (Nakane, 1963)
 Orychodes planicollis (Walker, 1859)
 Orychodes rubrosignatus (Kleine, 1921)
 Orychodes serrirostris Lund, 1800
 Orychodes sinensis Fairmaire, 1888
 Orychodes splendens Kirsch, 1875
 Orychodes versicolor (Kleine, 1921)

References 

Brentidae
Beetles described in 1862